The following highways are numbered 983:

Canada

United States